Dritan Hoxha (16 October 1968 – 23 May 2008) was an Albanian businessman. He was the founder of Top Media, Albania's largest media company.

Hoxha who started his business career as a coffee importer with the Lori Caffe, founded Top Media in 1998.

Media career
Firstly he founded Albanian radio station "Top Albania Radio". Along with Top Media he also founded the digital platform "DigitAlb" and the newspaper "Shqip". In 2008, DigitAlb became the first European Platform with 6 High Definition Channels and the second in the world. This was a big achievement for Albania. He clashed with Prime Minister Sali Berisha over satellite broadcasting rights. Berisha fined Hoxha's group 13 million euros, but they later reached a compromise. During this time he also faced accusations of tax evasion which he denied.

Top Media

On 14 February 1998, Dritan Hoxha founded Top Media also known as Top Albania Radio.

Death
Hoxha died on the morning of 23 May 2008 at about 02:00 in Tirana when he crashed his Ferrari 599 into a tree near Lana river. He died on the way to Tirana Military Hospital.

References

1968 births
2008 deaths
Road incident deaths in Albania
20th-century Albanian businesspeople
Albanian mass media owners
Telecommunications in Albania
Television in Albania
People from Kukës